The 2015–16 Moldovan "B" Division season' is the 25th since its establishment. A new system with three divisions was approved, coming back to the system that was used  between the 1993–94 and 1995–96 seasons.

Final standings

Center

North

South

References

 Regulamentul campionatului R. Moldova la fotbal ediţia 2015-2016

External links
 Divizia B - Results, fixtures, tables and news - Soccerway

Moldovan Liga 2 seasons
3
Moldova 3